Wallaceburg District Secondary School is a high school in Wallaceburg, Ontario, Canada.  It has a student population of about 600 and a faculty of around 40.  Due to its small number of students, Wallaceburg Secondary has made the school smaller in order to use the land as a sports field. Many students from Walpole Island First Nation attended or attend this high school.

Notable alumni
 Shaun Suisham, former NFL player

See also
List of high schools in Ontario

References

High schools in Chatham-Kent
Educational institutions established in 1912
1912 establishments in Ontario